The 2019 Tour of the Basque Country was a road cycling stage race, that took place between 8 and 13 April 2019 in Spain. It was the 59th edition of Tour of the Basque Country and the 15th race of the 2019 UCI World Tour. Ion Izagirre of Spain was the winner.

Participating teams
As the Tour of the Basque Country was a UCI World Tour event, all eighteen UCI WorldTeams were invited automatically and were obliged to enter a team in the race. Five UCI Professional Continental teams were awarded wildcard places, bringing the number of teams to twenty-three. As each team included seven riders, a total of 161 riders were due to start the first stage.

Route
The full route of the 2018 Tour of the Basque Country was announced on 27 February 2019.

Stages

Stage 1
8 April 2019 — Zumarraga to Zumarraga, individual time trial (ITT)

Stage 2
9 April 2019 — Zumarraga to Gorraiz,

Stage 3
10 April 2019 — Sarriguren to Estibaliz,

Stage 4
11 April 2019 — Vitoria-Gasteiz to Arrigorriaga,

Stage 5
12 April 2019 — Arrigorriaga to Arrate,

Stage 6
13 April 2019 — Eibar to Eibar–Arrate,

Classification leadership table

Final classification standings

General classification

Points classification

Mountains classification

Young rider classification

References

2019 UCI World Tour
2019 in Spanish sport
April 2019 sports events in Spain
2019